Princess Deoknyeong (d. 15 April 1375) was a Yuan Dynasty imperial family member who became a Korean queen consort by her marriage to Chunghye of Goryeo. Following her husband's deposition in 1344, she served as regent for their only son, King Chungmok from 1344 to 1348. She was the third Goryeo queen consort who came from Yuan dynasty to Goryeo. Her personal name was Borjigin Irenchenppan.

Biography

Early life
The future Princess Deoknyeong was born in Yuan dynasty with the name Borjigin Irenchenppan (보르지긴 이렌첸빤, 孛兒只斤 亦憐眞班) as the daughter of Chopal.

Marriage
In 1330 she married with Chunghye of Goryeo when he was in Yuan and 
they later arrived in Goryeo on July in the same year. In Goryeo, the King bestowed the "Yeongyeong Palace" (연경궁, 延慶宮) as her residence. Then, in 1337, she gave birth to their first son, the future king Chungmok of Goryeo and also a daughter, Princess Jangnyeong. She followed the Yuan Dynasty custom of marrying Goryeo princes into the family line.

Regency
In 1344, her husband was deposed and was succeeded by their only son. Due to her son's minority in, she became his regent and guardian. At the time of her regency, she led the national army and national affairs on behalf of King Chungmok who was still only eight years old. When Chungmok died without left any successor, Chunghye's other son from Consort Yun ascended the throne as King Chungjeong. Although the new king's biological mother was Lady Yun, but Princess Deoknyeong also involved to his minority and took part in the political affairs, which the King couldn't prevent this and his maternal clan opposed this. Knowing that Yun Si-u (윤시우) and Bae Jeon (배전) formed a dominant force those caused the political disturbances, Deoknyeong formally stepped down as a regent in 1348. Then, in 1350, the first Japanese Invasion continued and King Chungjeong was dethroned one year later in 1351.

Later life
Even after the appointment of King Gongmin, she was treated with great hospitality in Goryeo and become the Queen Mother. In 1367, her homeland gave her the Imperial title as Princess Jeongsunsugui (정순숙의공주, 貞順淑儀公主) and she then died on 15 April 1375 while her tomb is "Gyeongneung Tomb" (경릉, 頃陵).

In popular culture
Portrayed by Kim Yeo-jin in the 2005–2006 MBC TV series Shin Don.

See also
Goryeo under Mongol rule

References

덕녕공주 on Encykorea .
덕녕공주 on Doosan Encyclopedia .

14th-century Mongolian women
14th-century Korean women
1375 deaths
Mongol consorts of the Goryeo Dynasty
Year of birth unknown
Borjigin
14th-century women rulers
Princesses
Regents of Korea